Amrit Lal Bharti is an Indian politician. He was elected to the Lok Sabha the lower house of Indian Parliament from Chail in Uttar Pradesh  as a member of the Bharatiya Janata Party.

References

External links
Official biographical sketch in Parliament of India website 

India MPs 1996–1997
Lok Sabha members from Uttar Pradesh
1941 births
Living people
Bharatiya Janata Party politicians from Uttar Pradesh